Akbar Djuraev (born 8 October 1999) is an Uzbekistani weightlifter, Olympic Champion and Junior World Champion. He won the gold medal in the men's 109kg event at the 2020 Summer Olympics held in Tokyo, Japan. He also won the gold medal in the men's 109kg event at the 2021 World Weightlifting Championships held in Tashkent, Uzbekistan.

He competed in the 105 kg category until 2018, and the 102 kg and 109 kg categories starting in 2018 after the International Weightlifting Federation reorganized the categories.

He holds the junior world record in the snatch and total in the 102 kg division, as well as the snatch, clean & jerk and total in the 109 kg division.

Career
At the 2018 Junior World Weightlifting Championships, he competed in the 105 kg division, winning the silver medal in the snatch, clean & jerk, and total.

He competed at the 2018 World Weightlifting Championships in the 102 kg category, winning a gold medal in the snatch and setting the junior world records in the snatch and total.

In 2019, he competed at the 2019 Asian Weightlifting Championships in the 109 kg winning silver medals in all lifts and setting Junior World Records in the snatch, clean & jerk and total.

Major results

References

External links
 
 
 
 
 

1999 births
Living people
Uzbekistani male weightlifters
Weightlifters at the 2020 Summer Olympics
Medalists at the 2020 Summer Olympics
Olympic gold medalists for Uzbekistan
Olympic medalists in weightlifting
World Weightlifting Championships medalists
Olympic weightlifters of Uzbekistan
21st-century Uzbekistani people